Adam Chi Keung Tse (Traditional Chinese: 謝志強, born 22 June 1990) is a Hong Kong footballer of Hongkonger and Irish heritage who last played for Hong Kong First Division League club South China. His position is a striker.

He has a younger brother, Sean Tse, who also plays for Hong Kong club South China.

Early life 
Tse was born in City of Salford, Greater Manchester, to a Hong Kongese father and an English mother with Irish heritage in 1990. Two years later, his younger brother Sean Tse was born.

Club career

Non-league clubs in Manchester 
Unlike his brother Sean, Adam did not join any professional clubs' youth academy. Instead, he played for non-league teams in Manchester. He played for Clifton F.C. and Lighoaks Villa F.C.

South China 
His brother Sean was released by Manchester City in May 2012 and joined Hong Kong First Division League side South China in August 2012. Following his brother, Adam joined South China in January 2013 after a successful 2-week trial. On 2 February 2013, he made his debut for South China as a 69-minute substitute against Sun Pegasus. During the stoppage time, Adam fouled on Sun Pegasus' goalkeeper when the goalkeeper came out from the goalie and claimed the ball but referee insisted game playing on. This led to Dhiego Martins goal as well as a 1–1 draw.

International career 
Similar to Sean, Adam is eligible for Republic of Ireland through his maternal grand-parentage. On the other hand, Adam is also eligible for Hong Kong national football team if he successfully applied the HKSAR passport. His brother, Sean Tse, has joined the Hong Kong national football team and captained the team in the 2022 EAFF E-1 Football Championship.

Career stats

Club 
As of 4 May 2013

Honors

Club 
South China
Hong Kong First Division (1): 2012–13

References

External links 
 

1990 births
Living people
People from Salford
English footballers
English people of Hong Kong descent
English people of Irish descent
Hong Kong First Division League players
South China AA players
Association football forwards